Donald Scott may refer to:

Sportspeople
 Donald Scott (middle-distance runner) (1894–1980), American middle-distance runner and modern pentathlete
 Donald Scott (triple jumper) (born 1992), American triple jumper
 Don Scott (American football) (died 1943), American footballer for Ohio State University
 Don Scott (boxer) (1928–2013), British Olympic boxer
 Don Scott (Canadian football) (1927–2005), played for Toronto Argonauts
 Donald Scott (cricketer) (1898–1981), played first-class cricket for Somerset
 Don Scott (footballer, born 1929), Australian rules footballer for West Perth, South Melbourne, Swan Districts and Waverley
 Don Scott (footballer, born 1930) (1930–2002), Australian rules footballer for Geelong
 Don Scott (footballer, born 1947), Australian rules footballer for Hawthorn
 Donald Scott (rugby union) (born 1928), Scotland rugby union player

Other people
 Donald P. Scott, killed during a police raid in 1992
 Donald Scott (politician) (1901–1974), British politician
 Don Scott (Alberta politician) (born 1966), Canadian politician from Alberta
 Don Scott (Manitoba politician) (born 1948), Canadian politician from Manitoba
 Don Scott (Ontario author) (1924–2011), Canadian author and politician
 Don Scott (Virginia politician), American politician from Virginia
 Don Scott (Wyoming politician), American politician from Wyoming

Other uses
 Ohio State University Airport, nicknamed OSU Don Scott Airport